Sifang railway station is a railway station in Qingdao, Shandong, in the People's Republic of China.

History 
Until 2008, because the larger Qingdao railway station was undergoing renovations, the railway station in Qingdao's Sifang District served as Qingdao's primary railway station. From 27 July 2008, Sifang railway station stopped handling passenger services.

References

Trains originating from Sifang

Transport in Qingdao
Railway stations in Shandong